Less is more may refer to:

 Less is more (architecture), a phrase adopted in 1947 by architect Ludwig Mies van der Rohe
 Less Is More (Marillion album), 2009
 Less Is More (Lost Frequencies album), 2016
 Les Is More, a 2012 album by Ryan Leslie
 Less Is More Tour, a 2011 concert tour by Natasha Bedingfield
 "Less Is More", a song by Relient K from The Anatomy of the Tongue in Cheek
 "Less Is More", a song by Joss Stone from Mind Body & Soul
 "Less Is More" (The L Word: Generation Q), a 2019 television episode
 "Less Is More" (Roseanne), a 1992 television episode
 "Less is more", an ancient Greek proverb attributed to Chilon of Sparta

See also
 Minimalism
 Minimalism (computing)
 Less (disambiguation)
 More (disambiguation)
 Worse is better